Ivar Klingström (1 August 1897 – 29 September 1993) was a Swedish football midfielder.

References

1897 births
1993 deaths
Association football midfielders
Swedish footballers
Sweden international footballers
Örgryte IS players
Allsvenskan players